Bir Mrittunjoee (Bengali: বীর মৃত্যুঞ্জয়ী) is the second highest peacetime gallantry award of Bangladesh.

References 

Military awards and decorations of Bangladesh